Listeria newyorkensis is a species of bacteria. It is a Gram-positive, facultatively anaerobic, non-motile, non-spore-forming bacillus. It is non-pathogenic and non-hemolytic. It was discovered in a seafood processing plant in New York, and was first published in 2015.

Listeria newyorkensis "(c)an be differentiated from other species of the genus Listeria by the absence of the α-mannosidase reaction, inability to acidify D-arabitol, and ability to acidify D-ribose, D-galactose and L-arabinose."

References

External links
Type strain of Listeria newyorkensis at BacDive -  the Bacterial Diversity Metadatabase

newyorkensis
Bacteria described in 2015